Sura Qullu (Aymara sura dry jiquima, a species of Pachyrhizus, qullu mountain, "sura mountain", also spelled Zorra Khollu, Zorra Kkollu) is a  mountain in the Cordillera Real in the Bolivian Andes. It is situated in the La Paz Department, Sud Yungas Province, Yanacachi Municipality, north-east of the city of La Paz. Sura Qullu lies between the mountain Jathi Qullu in the north-west and the lake Warawarani in the south-east.

See also 
 Q'asiri

References 

Mountains of La Paz Department (Bolivia)